Pedro Julião Azevedo Junior (born 12 December 1985), known as Juninho Quixadá, is a Brazilian footballer who plays as a forward for Maracanã.

Career
Born in Quixadá, Juninho Quixadá has previously played for Ferroviário, as well as for Bragantino, before moving in 2011 to Bulgaria.

On 20 June 2011, Quixadá joined PFC Ludogorets Razgrad on a three-year contract for an undisclosed fee. He made his debut on 3 July in a 6–1 friendly win against Septemvri Simitli, playing 45 minutes on the right wing.

Juninho made his league debut for Ludogorets against Lokomotiv Plovdiv on 6 August 2011. He scored his first competitive goal on 20 August in a 4–0 victory against Vidima-Rakovski. On 11 September, he scored twice in a 6–0 win over Slavia Sofia. On 28 November 2011, in a 2–2 away draw against CSKA Sofia, Quixadá netted his fourth goal of the season and assisted Ivan Stoyanov. On 27 February 2014, he scored a last-minute goal against S.S. Lazio to bring the score to 3:3 and enable his team to advance to the 1/8 finals of the UEFA Europa League by 4:3 on aggregate.

After almost 7 years in Ludogorets, Quixada left the club on 11 January 2018 due to mutual agreement.

Club statistics
As of 11 January 2018

International career 
On 24 January 2013, Quixadá received a Bulgarian passport and potentially became able to play for Bulgaria. He said that he would be happy to represent Bulgaria on the international level.

Honours

Club 
 Ludogorets
 Bulgarian First Professional League: 2011–12, 2012–13, 2013–14, 2014–15, 2015-16, 2016–17
 Bulgarian Cup: 2011–12, 2013–14
 Bulgarian Supercup: 2012, 2014

References

External links
 
 

1985 births
Living people
Sportspeople from Ceará
Naturalised citizens of Bulgaria
Brazilian footballers
Association football forwards
Campeonato Brasileiro Série A players
Campeonato Brasileiro Série B players
Campeonato Brasileiro Série D players
First Professional Football League (Bulgaria) players
Ferroviário Atlético Clube (CE) players
Clube Atlético Bragantino players
Ceará Sporting Club players
PFC Ludogorets Razgrad players
Horizonte Futebol Clube players
Esporte Clube Vitória players
ABC Futebol Clube players
Brazilian expatriate footballers
Brazilian emigrants to Bulgaria
Brazilian expatriate sportspeople in Bulgaria
Expatriate footballers in Bulgaria